Doogie Kameāloha, M.D. is an American family medical comedy-drama developed by Kourtney Kang that is based on the 1989–93 ABC television series Doogie Howser, M.D.. It stars Peyton Elizabeth Lee as the title character of Lahela "Doogie" Kameāloha, and Kathleen Rose Perkins, Jeffrey Bowyer-Chapman, Jason Scott Lee, and Ronny Chieng in supporting roles. The series premiered September 8, 2021 on Disney+. In February 2022, the series was renewed for a second season which is set to premiere on March 31, 2023.

Premise
Lahela "Doogie" Kameāloha is a child prodigy juggling her teenage life and family with an early medical career, as well as having to deal with balancing her relationship with her mother, who is also her boss. Lahela has the nickname "Doogie" from the television show Doogie Howser, M.D. which others have watched.

Cast

Main

 Peyton Elizabeth Lee as Lahela "Doogie" Kameāloha, a 16-year-old University of Hawaii Medical School graduate. She is nicknamed "Doogie" because of the television show Doogie Howser, M.D.
 Emma Meisel as Steph Denisco, Doogie's best friend. She has a crush on Doogie’s brother, Kai.
 Matt Sato as Kai Kameāloha, Doogie's older brother. He has a crush on Doogie’s best friend, Steph, but doesn’t know how to express his feelings. 
 Wes Tian as Brian Patrick Kameāloha, Doogie's younger brother 
 Jeffrey Bowyer-Chapman as Charles Zeller, one of Doogie's colleagues at Oahu Health Medical Center
 Mapuana Makia as Noelani Nakayama, another colleague of Doogie's at Oahu Health Medical Center
 Kathleen Rose Perkins as Dr. Clara Hannon, Doogie's mother and the chief of medicine at Oahu Health Medical Center where Doogie works
 Jason Scott Lee as Benny Kameāloha, Doogie's father and the owner of a food truck called Benny's Shave Ice and Flowers

Recurring

 Ronny Chieng as Dr. Lee, a heart surgeon at Oahu Health Medical Center
 Alex Aiono as Walter Taumata, a local teenage surfer whom Doogie is romantically interested in

Guest stars
 Barry Bostwick as Will, a patient of Lahela's suffering from heart failure who passes away in the first episode. He is the first patient she's ever lost and originally the only person allowed to call her Doogie.
 Randall Park as Dr. Choi, the chief of staff at Oahu Health Medical Center who leaving for another position with the Los Angeles Lakers
 Magic Johnson as Himself
 Margaret Cho as Frankie, a patient of Lahela's who has chronic renal failure and needs a new kidney
 Max Greenfield as Dr. Arthur Goldstein

Episodes

Production
It was announced in April 2020 that a female-led remake of Doogie Howser, M.D. was put into development at Disney+, developed by Kourtney Kang. The series is set in Hawaii to reflect Kang's background. In September 2020, it was picked to series by Disney+. In January 2021, Peyton Elizabeth Lee was cast in the titular role, with Kathleen Rose Perkins, Jeffrey Bowyer-Chapman, and Jason Scott Lee cast as leads. Mapuana Makia and Matthew Sato joined the cast as series regulars in the following months. In March 2021, Ronny Chieng joined in a recurring role while Emma Meisel was cast in a main role. Filming began on December 7, 2020, in Honolulu and Los Angeles. On February 3, 2022, Disney+ renewed the series for a second season.

Release
The series premiered on Disney+ on September 8, 2021. The rest of the episodes were released weekly on Wednesdays. The second season is scheduled to be released on March 31, 2023.

Reception

Critical response
The review aggregator website Rotten Tomatoes reported a 92% approval rating with an average rating of 6.6/10, based on 13 critic reviews. The website's critics consensus reads, "With a winning cast and a great bedside manner, Doogie Kamealoha, M.D. pays homage to its predecessor while successfully carving its own charming path." Metacritic gave the series a weighted average score of 75 out of 100 based on 5 critic reviews, indicating "generally favorable reviews".

Daniel Fienberg of The Hollywood Reporter stated that the series serves as an example of how a franchise can be modernized across time, claiming it succeeds to provide a story that can appeal to the nostalgic audience of Doogie Howser, M.D. and still manages to be a good story that can stand on its own, while complimenting the performances of the cast. Joel Keller of Decider claimed that the show manages to distinguish itself from Doogie Howser, M.D by creating its own identity, citing its gender-flipped lead character and the story sets in Hawaii, found the series funny and family-oriented, and praised the chemistry between the actors and their performances. Caroline Framke of Variety described the show as a sweet, bright, and earnest Disney Channel sitcom. Polly Conway of Common Sense Media rated the series 4 out of 5 stars, acclaimed the depiction of positive messages, citing compassion, courage, and teamwork, applauded the presence of positive role models, stating that Peyton Elizabeth Lee's character demonstrates sensitivity and consideration for the needs of other individuals, while complimenting the diversity of the cast members.

Accolades

Notes

References

External links

2020s American comedy-drama television series
2020s American medical television series
2020s American teen drama television series
2020s American workplace comedy television series
2020s American workplace drama television series
2021 American television series debuts
Disney+ original programming
English-language television shows
Television series about families
Television series about teenagers
Television series by 20th Century Fox Television
Television series reboots
Television shows filmed in Hawaii
Television shows filmed in Los Angeles
Television shows set in Hawaii